In Greek mythology, Antenor (Ancient Greek: Ἀντήνωρ Antḗnōr) was a counselor to King Priam  of Troy during the events of the Trojan War.

Description 
Antenor was described by the chronicler Malalas in his account of the Chronography as "tall, thin, white, blond, small-eyed, hook-nosed, crafty, cowardly, secure, a story-teller, eloquent". Meanwhile, in the account of Dares the Phrygian, he was illustrated as "...tall, graceful, swift, crafty, and cautious."

Family
Antenor was variously named as the son of the Dardanian noble Aesyetes by Cleomestra or of Hicetaon. He was the husband of Theano, daughter of Cisseus of Thrace, who bore him at least one daughter, Crino, and numerous sons, including Acamas, Agenor, Antheus, Archelochus, Coön, Demoleon, Eurymachus, Glaucus, Helicaon, Iphidamas, Laodamas, Laodocus, Medon, Polybus and Thersilochus (most of whom perished during the Trojan War). He was also the father of a bastard son, Pedaeus, by an unknown woman. According to numerous scholars, Antenor was actually related to Priam.

Mythology 
Antenor was one of the wisest of the Trojan elders and counsellors. In the Homeric account of the Trojan War, Antenor advised the Trojans to return Helen to her husband and otherwise proved sympathetic to a negotiated peace with the Greeks. In later developments of the myths, particularly per Dares and Dictys, Antenor was made an open traitor, unsealing the city gates to the enemy. As payment, his house—marked by a panther skin over the door—was spared during the sack of the city.

His subsequent fate varied across the authors. He was said to have rebuilt a city on the site of Troy; to have settled at Cyrene; the shore of the Tyrrhenian Sea; or to have founded Patavium (modern Padua), Korčula, or other cities in eastern Italy.

In literature

 Antenor appears briefly in Homer's Iliad. In Book 3 he is present when Helen identifies for Priam each of the Greek warriors from the wall of Troy; when she describes Odysseus, Antenor confirmed her account, alluded to how he entertained Odysseus and Menelaus and got to know both. In the same book, he accompanied Priam to the front line and bore witness of the King's speech before the duel between Menelaus and his son, Paris. In Book 7, as mentioned above, he advises the Trojans to give Helen back, but Paris refuses to yield.
 Antenor is mentioned in Vergil's Aeneid in book 1, line 243, when Venus tells Jupiter that Antenor had escaped from the fall of Troy and founded Patavium, modern Padua.
 In Dares Phrygius' de excidio Trojae historia , Antenor betrays Troy to the Greeks.
 In Geoffrey of Monmouth's Historia Regum Britanniae, Antenor and his followers were banished from Troy, and settled on the shore of the Tyrrhenian Sea; Brutus of Troy later discovers several nations descended from them living there, led by Corineus.
 In Geoffrey Chaucer's Troilus and Criseyde, Antenor appears as a minor, non-speaking, character who has been taken prisoner by the Greeks but is returned by them in exchange for Criseyde.
 The circle Antenora is named after him in the poem Inferno in Dante Alighieri's Divine Comedy. It is located in Hell's Circle of Treachery which is reserved for traitors of cities, countries, and political parties. 
Antenor appears as a character in William Shakespeare's play Troilus and Cressida, set during the Trojan War.

In History
Mikhail Lomonosov in his "Ancient Russian History" deduced as a progenitor of the Slavs and Russians: "Cato has the same in mind when the Venetians, as Pliny testifies, are descended from the Trojan tribe. All this the great and authoritative historian Titus Livy shows and carefully explains. "Antenor," he writes, "came after many wanderings to the inner extremity of the Adriatic gulf with a multitude of the Enenites, who had been driven out of Paphlagonia and at Troy had lost their king Pilimenes: to move to that place they sought a leader. After the expulsion of the Euganeans, who lived between the sea and the Alpine mountains, the Henites and Trojans occupied these lands. That is why the name of the settlement was Troy, and the whole nation was called the Venetians".

Eponym
The minor planet 2207 Antenor, discovered in 1977 by Soviet astronomer Nikolai Stepanovich Chernykh, is named after him.

Notes

References
 Apollodorus, The Library with an English Translation by Sir James George Frazer, F.B.A., F.R.S. in 2 Volumes, Cambridge, MA, Harvard University Press; London, William Heinemann Ltd. 1921. ISBN 0-674-99135-4. Online version at the Perseus Digital Library. Greek text available from the same website.

 
Dictys Cretensis, from The Trojan War. The Chronicles of Dictys of Crete and Dares the Phrygian translated by Richard McIlwaine Frazer, Jr. (1931-). Indiana University Press. 1966. Online version at the Topos Text Project.
Homer, The Iliad with an English Translation by A.T. Murray, Ph.D. in two volumes. Cambridge, MA., Harvard University Press; London, William Heinemann, Ltd. 1924. . Online version at the Perseus Digital Library.
 Homer, Homeri Opera in five volumes. Oxford, Oxford University Press. 1920. . Greek text available at the Perseus Digital Library.

 Pausanias, Description of Greece with an English Translation by W.H.S. Jones, Litt.D., and H.A. Ormerod, M.A., in 4 Volumes. Cambridge, MA, Harvard University Press; London, William Heinemann Ltd. 1918. . Online version at the Perseus Digital Library
 Pausanias, Graeciae Descriptio. 3 vols. Leipzig, Teubner. 1903.  Greek text available at the Perseus Digital Library.
Publius Vergilius Maro, Aeneid. Theodore C. Williams. trans. Boston. Houghton Mifflin Co. 1910. Online version at the Perseus Digital Library.
Publius Vergilius Maro, Bucolics, Aeneid, and Georgics. J. B. Greenough. Boston. Ginn & Co. 1900. Latin text available at the Perseus Digital Library.
 
 Tzetzes, John, Allegories of the Iliad translated by Goldwyn, Adam J. and Kokkini, Dimitra. Dumbarton Oaks Medieval Library, Harvard University Press, 2015.

Trojans
People of the Trojan War